Oliver William Skipp (born 16 September 2000) is an English professional footballer who plays as a midfielder for Premier League club Tottenham Hotspur.

Club career
Skipp started his youth career with Bengeo Tigers FC before joining Tottenham Hotspur in 2008. On 29 August 2018, Skipp signed a three-year contract with Tottenham. He made his professional debut for Tottenham in a 3–1 EFL Cup win over West Ham United on 31 October. He made his league debut in a home match against Southampton, coming on as a late substitute in a 3–1 win, and made his first start on 15 December in a 1–0 win against Burnley. In January 2019, Skipp assisted two goals in a in Tottenham's 7–0 win against Tranmere Rovers in the FA Cup.

On 17 July 2020, Skipp signed a new three-year contract with the option of a fourth with Tottenham. For the 2020–21, season he joined Norwich City on loan. Skipp scored the first goal of his career in Norwich's 3–1 win at Birmingham City on 23 February 2021. Skipp went on to help Norwich win the Championship and was included in the 2021 PFA Team of the Year.

Skipp established himself as a regular starter for Tottenham in the first half of the 2021-22 season, making 18 appearances before suffering a pelvic injury in January, which saw him miss the rest of the season. On 20 April 2022, Skipp signed a new five-year contract with Tottenham that is set to expire in 2027. Skipp made his return from injury in a pre-season friendly on 13 July 2022. On 26th February 2023, in the London Derby against Chelsea, he scored the opener 19 seconds after the second half restart for his first senior goal for Spurs and his first in two years.

International career
Skipp has represented England at Under-16, Under-17 and Under-18 levels.

On 30 August 2019, he was included in the England U21 squad for the first time. He eventually made his U21 debut on 11 October 2019 as a substitute during a 2–2 draw against Slovenia in Maribor.

Style of play
Skipp operates as a defensive midfielder, and is known for his ability to break up play and win the ball. 

Then-teammate Grant Hanley said of Skipp in January 2021 that "he has experience beyond his years," and praised his ability to read the game and make decisions under pressure.

Personal life
Skipp was born in Welwyn Garden City and grew up in Hertford. From 2003 to 2012, he attended Duncombe Primary School and Richard Hale School in Hertford. Skipp played youth football for Bengeo Tigers FC.

Career statistics

Honours
Norwich City
EFL Championship: 2020–21

Individual honours
PFA Team of the Year: 2020–21 Championship

References

External links

Profile at the Tottenham Hotspur F.C. website

2000 births
Living people
Sportspeople from Welwyn Garden City
Footballers from Hertfordshire
English footballers
Association football midfielders
Tottenham Hotspur F.C. players
Norwich City F.C. players
Premier League players
English Football League players
England youth international footballers
England under-21 international footballers